Hatay Airport  is an international airport in Hatay Province, Turkey, serving the cities of Antakya ( by road) and Iskenderun. Built in what used to be the center of the now drained Lake Amik, it was inaugurated in December 2007.

The airport's only runway suffered catastrophic damage during the earthquake in February 2023, which caused the airport to close for traffic.

Airlines and destinations
The following airlines operate regular scheduled and charter flights at Hatay Airport:

Traffic statistics 

Source: DHMI.gov.tr

Ground transport
Antakya and İskenderun are connected by coaches and taxis.

References

Airports established in 2007
2007 establishments in Turkey
Airports in Turkey
Buildings and structures in Hatay Province
Transport in Hatay Province
Buildings damaged by the 2023 Turkey–Syria earthquake